The Guard Hussar Regiment Mounted Squadron (HESK), is part of the Guard Hussar Regiment. The purpose of the squadron is to provide mounted escorts for the Royal family and carry ceremonial services for the Royal Danish Army. The squadron commands 75 horses, 18 officers and NCOs, and 75-100 conscripts. In addition it has a saddler, music-teacher, veterinarian, remount service and a farrier.

History
In 1762, there was a possibility of war between Denmark and Russia. The general staff was wary of the coming battle, due to the Cossacks, and Denmark's inability to counter the light cavalry. Inspired by the Hungarian hussars, Denmark created their own hussar regiment and adopted a similar uniform.

Conscription
The conscripts serve for 1 year, the longest time for a conscript in Denmark, with two troops starting each year, in February and August. It is also the only place where conscripts are issued silver monograms, all others regiments being issued brass monograms, of either the Queen or the Prince Consort. They will normally have 3–4 months of basic military training, before moving on to stable duty, where they learn basic stable duty, basic horseback riding, escort and show training, and music lessons. Each Wednesday the conscripts will practice escorts, by riding through the town of Slagelse, this is also to prepare the horses for moving amongst traffic.

Uniform

The current ceremonial uniform of the Guard Hussar Regiment dates from 1870. 
It contains:
A Blue Dolman: The original dolman was replaced in 1870, with a simplified version that has fewer braids across the chest.
A Red Pelisse (jacket): The pelisse was introduced in 1762. With the introduction of the new dolman in 1870, the pelisse was removed from the uniform. It was, however, possible to wear the old ones until they were worn out. King Edward VII of the United Kingdom suggested to reintroduce the pelisse, but only for officers who had to buy them privately in either case. The pelisse for NCOs and privates from before 1870, are said to still being "worn out" and are therefore still used today. Both versions of the pelisse are provided with lanyards used for holding the pelisse in place, when worn from the left shoulder. These lanyards are called mantequets. Officers wear Cardinal red, where NCOs and enlisted wear Crimson red. It is the only hussar regiment in the world to still use it.
Blue Riding Breeches: The current light blue breeches with a white stripe along the outseam were introduced in 1822. The original breeches in 1762 were also light blue, but between 1774-1822 different colours were used, yellow were however most common.
A sabretache (pouch): In the colours of the regiment, with the royal monogram. It is the only uniform in the world to still use it, and has been in use since Frederick V.
 A shako with a cordon and pompom made of tail hairs for NCOs and enlisted, officers have white buffalohair. There are two colours for pompoms, red for the Bugle Corps while the rest have white.
A shabraque (saddlecloth): In the colours of the regiment, with the royal monogram. It remains mostly unchanged since 1762 for troopers, but officers used a different design during the Napoleonic Wars.
A Bridle: The bridle has cowries woven into it. It was meant to make the horse look like a skeleton, but also to protect the horse from sabre cuts and to signify wealth. It was first introduced in 1787, but it is not clear if it was initially limited to the 'Bosnic' lancer squadron as images from the period show unadorned tack.

References

Military units and formations established in 2001
Danish Army regiments
Guards regiments
Cavalry regiments of Denmark
Military of Denmark